"Breakdown" is the debut single by American post-grunge band Tantric and the lead single from their self-titled debut album. It is the band's most successful song, having reached number one on Billboards Mainstream Rock Tracks and helped the album achieve gold status in 2001.

Lyrically, "Breakdown" describes a high school student filled with resentment and self-disgust. The music video found substantial airplay on MTV2. In combination with the band's acoustic-heavy sound, "Breakdown" also utilizes a digital effect at the end of the chorus. The tightly produced arrangement makes for a well balanced ratio of hard rock and pop.

Guitarist Todd Whitener came up with the song while sitting in an Amsterdam hotel. He described the meaning behind "Breakdown" in an interview with MTV:
"That song's pretty much about being pooped on and realizing that life is going to move on and you just have to keep your head high. Things will work out in the end, as long as you stay positive."

Appearances
The song was included on the soundtrack to the 2001 film Driven and The Shield: Music from the Streets in 2005. It was also featured on the Spin This, Monitor This!, and Noize compilations.  The song also appears in an episode of The Shield (Partners, Season 2, episode 3).

Charts

References

2001 debut singles
2001 songs
Tantric (band) songs
Maverick Records singles
Music videos directed by Marcos Siega
Songs written by Hugo Ferreira
Songs written by Jesse Vest
Songs written by Todd Whitener
Songs written by Matt Taul